Tatyana Vasilevna Bakiyeva (born on 26 January, late-1940s) is a Kyrgyzstani public figure who is the wife of former President of Kyrgyzstan, Kurmanbek Bakiyev and the First Lady of Kyrgyzstan from March 2005 to April 2010.

Russian by ethnicity, she was born in Kuybyshev (now Samara) in the RSFSR and was raised in the Moldovan SSR (now Moldova). She eventually moved back to Samara and studied at the Kuybyshev Polytechnical Institute. She began her career in 1971 working at large industrial enterprises such as the production association "ZIM" in Samara. It was in Samara where she met her husband Kurmanbek Bakiyev, who was studying at her alma-mater. When she originally told her parents about her relationship with Bakiyev, they questioned her over why she would be engaged with someone of Kyrgyz ethnicity over an ethnic Russian. They eventually married in 1970 and had their sons Marat and Maxim in the city 2 and 7 years later respectively.

In 1979, her whole family moved to Bakiev's native Kyrgyzstan and settled down in Jalal-Abad. For a short period of time, she headed the Chui Regional Branch of the Meerim Foundation, which her predecessor Mayram Akayeva, founded. After the 2005 Tulip Revolution, her husband became president and she became first lady. While she was first lady, she showed minimal activity, limiting herself to accompanying her Bakiyev at official meetings and various government events. She has not been seen since the Kyrgyz Revolution of 2010, with her husband going into exile in Minsk with his 2 sons and Kyrgyz mistress Nazgul Tolomusheva. Besides the Russian language, which is Bakiyeva's native language, she is also conversant in the Kyrgyz language.

References 

Living people
People from Samara, Russia
First ladies and gentlemen of Kyrgyzstan
Russian emigrants to Kyrgyzstan
Kyrgyzstani engineers
Year of birth missing (living people)